José Francisco "Jo Jo" Jiménez (March 20, 1946 – August 28, 1969) was a United States Marine Corps Lance Corporal who posthumously received the Medal of Honor for heroism in the Vietnam War in August 1969.

Early years
José Jimémez was born on March 20, 1946, in Mexico City, Mexico. He attended Benito Juárez School and José María Morelos School in Morelia, Michoacán. He graduated from Red Rock Elementary School, Red Rock, Arizona, in June 1964, and from Santa Cruz Valley Union High School, Eloy, Arizona, in June 1968.

Enlisting in the Marine Corps Reserve at Phoenix, Arizona on June 7, 1968, Jiménez was discharged to enlist in the regular Marine Corps, August 12, 1968. He completed recruit training with the 1st Recruit Training Battalion at Marine Corps Recruit Depot San Diego, California, in October 1968. He was promoted to private first class on October 1, 1968. Transferred to the Marine Corps Base Camp Pendleton, California, he underwent individual combat training with Company G, 1st Battalion, 2nd Infantry Training Regiment and with the Rifle Training Company of the 2nd Infantry Training Regiment, completing the latter in December 1968.

Ordered to the Republic of Vietnam in February 1969, Jiménez was assigned duty as a guide and fire team leader with Company K, 3rd Battalion, 7th Marines, 1st Marine Division. He was promoted to lance corporal on June 16, 1969. While participating in action against the enemy south of Da Nang, Quảng Nam Province, on August 28, 1969, he was killed in action.

Jimenez's mother, Basillia Jimenez, was employed by the Mexican government, working in Arizona. On September 6, 1969, she had Jimenez's remains buried in Morelia, Michoacan, Mexico. His mother died and was buried in Glendale Memorial Park Cemetery. With donations from various organizations his sister, who is his next of kin, was able to recover his remains and have them sent to Arizona. On January 17, 2017, LCpl Jimenez was re-interred and buried next to his mother, in Glendale Memorial Park Cemetery in Glendale, Arizona

Medal of Honor
Medal of Honor citation:

Awards and honors
Jiménez's medals include: 

 Jiménez's name is inscribed on the Vietnam Veterans Memorial on Panel 18W Line 002.
 The Marine Barracks in Rota, Spain is named "Jiménez Hall" in honor of Jiménez.

See also

 List of Medal of Honor recipients
 List of Medal of Honor recipients for the Vietnam War
 List of Hispanic Medal of Honor recipients
 Hispanics in the United States Marine Corps

Notes

Further reading
 Unit Action involving Lance Corporal Jimenez, His MOH Bravery, and the ferocious battles fought by the Army and Marines in Hiep Duc Valley during August 1969. See Keith William Nolan (1987). "Death Valley" – The Summer Offensive I Corps, August 1969

External links

 

1946 births
1969 deaths
United States Marine Corps Medal of Honor recipients
Mexican emigrants to the United States
United States Marines
American military personnel killed in the Vietnam War
Foreign-born Medal of Honor recipients
Recipients of the Gallantry Cross (Vietnam)
Vietnam War recipients of the Medal of Honor
United States Marine Corps personnel of the Vietnam War